Infix notation is the notation commonly used in arithmetical and logical formulae and statements.

Usage
Binary relations are often denoted by an infix symbol such as set membership a ∈ A when the set A has a for an element. In geometry, perpendicular lines a and b are denoted  and in projective geometry two points b and c are in perspective when  while they are connected by a projectivity when 

Infix notation is more difficult to parse by computers than prefix notation (e.g. + 2 2) or postfix notation (e.g. 2 2 +). However many programming languages use it due to its familiarity. It is more used in arithmetic, e.g. 5 × 6.

Further notations
Infix notation may also be distinguished from function notation, where the name of a function suggests a particular operation, and its arguments are the operands. An example of such a function notation would be S(1, 3) in which the function S denotes addition ("sum"): .

Order of operations
In infix notation, unlike in prefix or postfix notations, parentheses surrounding groups of operands and operators are necessary to indicate the intended order in which operations are to be performed. In the absence of parentheses, certain precedence rules determine the order of operations.

See also 
 Tree traversal: Infix (In-order) is also a tree traversal order. It is described in a more detailed manner on this page.
 Calculator input methods: comparison of notations as used by pocket calculators
 Postfix notation, also called Reverse Polish notation
 Prefix notation, also called Polish notation
 Shunting yard algorithm, used to convert infix notation to postfix notation or to a tree
 Operator (computer programming)

References

External links 
 RPN or DAL? A brief analysis of Reverse Polish Notation against Direct Algebraic Logic
Infix to postfix convertor[sic]

Mathematical notation
Operators (programming)